Jayaben Thakkar (born 14 May 1952) is a former member of Lok Sabha. She represented the Vadodara constituency of Gujarat in the 14th Lok Sabha and is a member of the Bharatiya Janata Party.

External links
 Official biographical sketch in Parliament of India website

Living people
1952 births
People from Vadodara
India MPs 2004–2009
Women in Gujarat politics
India MPs 1998–1999
India MPs 1999–2004
Lok Sabha members from Gujarat
21st-century Indian women politicians
21st-century Indian politicians
20th-century Indian women politicians
20th-century Indian politicians
Women members of the Lok Sabha
Bharatiya Janata Party politicians from Gujarat